Marina Boduljak is a road cyclist from Croatia. She represented her nation at the 2009 UCI Road World Championships.

References

External links
 profile at Procyclingstats.com

Croatian female cyclists
Living people
Place of birth missing (living people)
Date of birth missing (living people)
Year of birth missing (living people)